Tveit is a village and surrounding district in Oddernes borough in the city of Kristiansand in Agder county, Norway. The Tveit district is located in the northeastern part of Kristiansand, northeast of the Topdalsfjorden along the lower part of the Tovdalselva river. Tveit is the site of the main airport for Southern Norway: Kristiansand Airport, Kjevik. The district was the separate municipality of Tveit from 1838 until it was merged into Kristiansand in 1965.

Tveit Church is located in the village. The stone church was built in the 12th century, and it is the oldest building in the village.

Name
The district (originally the parish) was named after the old Tveit farm (Old Norse: Þveit), since the Tveit Church was built there. The name is identical with the word þveit which means "a piece of cleared land cut from a forest".  The name spelled differently over the centuries: Tved, Thvet, and Tveid.

Sports
In 2010, the Kristiansand City Council had a vote on which district should have a new sports hall. The 2 finalists were Tveit and Randesund. In a final bid to win the facility, the people from Tveit launched a supporters meeting outside the council offices with about 300 attendees. Randesund supporters were also there numbering about 10. The same day it was announced that Tveit had won the bid.

Currently there is a small sports hall in Tveit at the Ve School which is used by various organisations.

The Tveit Skisenter is also the largest ski resort in Kristiansand. It even has ski escalators.

Transportation

Politics 
The 10 largest politics parties in Tveit as of 2015:

Neighbourhoods 
 Boen
 Bjørndalen
 Brattvollsheia
 Drangsholt
 Dønnestad
 Foss
 Grødum
 Hamre
 Hamreheia
 Hamresanden
 Kjevik
 Kråkebumoen
 Ryen
 Solsletta
 Topdalen
 Ve

Media gallery

Notable residents
Bernt Balchen (1899–1973), a Norwegian American aviator
Marcus Gjøe Rosenkrantz, the First Minister of Norway from 1814–1815
Norwegian author Karl Ove Knausgaard (born 1968).

Notable visitor 

Former Vice President of the United States, Hubert Humphrey (1911–1978), had family ties to the area, and visited relatives here in 1951 and 1969, and is honored by a memorial stone near Tveit Church.

References

External links
Tveit Snow Ski field 
Tveit Veterinary Clinic 
Tveit Boxing Club 
Tveit Sports Association 

Tveit Historical Society 
Weather information for Tveit 

Villages in Agder
Populated places in Agder
Geography of Kristiansand
Boroughs of Kristiansand